A resource map (ReM) is a concept of the ORE Model for associating an identity with compound digital objects (aggregations of digital resources) and making assertions about their structure and semantics. Compound objects combine distributed resources, including multiple media types.

ReM Serialization
A Resource Map may be serialized (or represented) in several different formats including Atom feeds, RDF/XML, RDFa, and others.  

The example below illustrates how a ReM can represent the arXiv e-print at https://arxiv.org/abs/astro-ph/0601007 using an Atom feed. Metadata such as the digital object identifier, title, and authors for the e-print are included first in the Atom feed. The e-print is a compound digital object composed of five aggregated resources which are listed next: OAI-PMH metadata about the e-print, a splash page, a PostScript version of the e-print, a PDF version, and a gzipped tar file containing multiple versions of the e-print.

Notes

See also
 Open Archives Initiative Object Reuse and Exchange
 Atom Syndication Format
 Open Archives Initiative

External links
 ORE website
 ORE Google Group
 ORE Atom Resource Map Validator (currently broken, since June 2010). 

Archival science